José Luis Gaitán (born 7 September 1957) is an Argentine footballer. He played in three matches for the Argentina national football team in 1979. He was also part of Argentina's squad for the 1979 Copa América tournament.

References

External links
 

1957 births
Living people
Argentine footballers
Argentina international footballers
Association football midfielders
Sportspeople from Rosario, Santa Fe